Diaka Sidibé is a Guinean politician.

References 

Living people
Year of birth missing (living people)
21st-century Guinean politicians
21st-century Guinean women politicians
Government ministers of Guinea
Women government ministers of Guinea

Higher education ministers